Richard K. Bernstein (born June 17, 1934) is a physician and an advocate for a low-carbohydrate diabetes diet to help achieve normal blood sugars for diabetics. Bernstein has type 1 diabetes. His private medical practice in Mamaroneck, New York is devoted solely to treating diabetes and prediabetes.

Biography

Bernstein attended The Franklin School, a college prep school on Upper West Side of Manhattan, and graduated from Columbia University with a BA in 1954 and a BS in 1955. He worked as an industrial-management engineer and director of research, development and marketing for Clay Adams, a manufacturer and supplier of medical laboratory equipment. He then became director of corporate planning at National Silver Industries, an importer and manufacturer of housewares. 

Bernstein was diagnosed with Type 1 diabetes at age 12 in 1946. In 1969, he sought to acquire a blood glucose testing kit, which at the time were only sold to doctors. At the time, he was a systems engineer. He bought a blood glucose meter manufactured by Miles Laboratories. Because he was not a doctor the meter was issued to his wife, who was a psychiatrist. He became the first diabetic patient to monitor their own blood sugar. By trial and error, he found that he could keep his blood sugar at normal non-diabetic levels by eating small low-carbohydrate meals covered by small doses of insulin (Bernstein 2011). 

Bernstein's efforts to publish articles on his experience in medical journals were rejected because he was not a doctor. He applied to and was accepted at the Albert Einstein College of Medicine at age 45 and graduated as an endocrinologist. He proceeded to establish a clinical practice using treatment methods based on his own experience.

Diabetes treatment

Bernstein's diet is extremely low-carbohydrate in that it completely eliminates all simple sugars and starches, and restricts other carbohydrates to 30 grams a day spread out over 3 small meals (6g at breakfast, 12g at lunch and 12g at dinner), with gaps of around 4 hours between meals to enable more accurate postprandial blood glucose tracking. This diet is combined with exercise with an emphasis on resistance-based muscle-building exercise, and supported by medication if needed. For insulin-dependent diabetics, he advocates taking insulin as small doses before each meal, to exactly cover that meal. The goal of the program is to simulate the blood sugars of non-diabetics, which according to Bernstein are close to 83 mg/dL or 4.6 mmol/L most of the time. If this goal can be reached and maintained, further complications due to high blood sugar would stop, though earlier damage cannot be reversed. Diabetes is perfectly controlled, in effect "cured". (Bernstein 2011)

The rationale behind the approach is what Bernstein calls "the law of small numbers" (Bernstein 2011). For Type 1 diabetics, there is always inevitable error in predicting the insulin dose to cover a meal, and this error is bigger when the meal is high-carb and the required insulin dose is bigger (inevitable error because the insulin absorption process is part of a complex system with non-linear dynamics, making exact predictions impossible). Restricting to small doses of both insulin and carbs reduces this error sharply and makes control more precise. In other words, taking small doses of insulin to cover a small dose of slow-acting carbs prevents inadvertent big under- or over- doses that could cause dangerous spikes or crashes in blood sugar. The logic extends somewhat to early-stage Type 2 diabetics who depend on their body's own erratic production of insulin. When smaller doses of insulin are needed from their body, their ability to control blood sugars improves.

Bernstein's patients include vegetarians, for whom the low-carbohydrate meals include a variety of non-starchy vegetables, tofu, and cheese or yogurt where permitted. (Bernstein 2011)

Controversy

Dr. Bernstein contends that high blood sugars are the cause of all diabetic complications, and therefore that tightly controlling blood sugar eliminates complications. This contention was at first at odds with established medical opinion, as the sugar-complications link was not yet clearly established from scientific studies. A 1993 study supported Bernstein's position that tight control of blood sugar leads to better health.

Bernstein's low-carbohydrate diet  was initially opposed by the American Diabetes Association, which recommended a high-carbohydrate low-fat diet for diabetics. The ADA has since changed its position to allow a low-carbohydrate diet as an acceptable option for diabetics. The UK NHS has also introduced a low-carbohydrate plan for diabetics and prediabetics. 

Bernstein's focus on maintaining low blood sugar targets conflicts with mainstream guidance to maintain a higher fasting blood sugar target for insulin-dependent patients (such as Type 1 diabetics). This higher target is to reduce the risk of hypoglycemia which can be fatal. Type 1 diabetics on Bernstein's regime need to be constantly on guard against hypoglycemia. Bernstein claims however that the hypoglycemia risk is even higher with the high-carb low-fat original ADA standard diet because it requires big doses of insulin.

Bibliography

References

Further reading

External links

1934 births
Albert Einstein College of Medicine alumni
American diabetologists
American health and wellness writers
American nutritionists
Columbia College (New York) alumni
Columbia School of Engineering and Applied Science alumni
Columbia University School of General Studies alumni
Fellows of the American College of Nutrition
Living people
Low-carbohydrate diet advocates
People from Mamaroneck, New York